KFIN is a commercial radio station located in Jonesboro, Arkansas, broadcasting on 107.9 FM.  KFIN airs a country music format. KFIN is a 98,000 watt station, reaching listeners in all of Northeast Arkansas, as well as Southeast Missouri, Western Tennessee, and Western Mississippi.

The station was purchased in 2007 by Bobby Caldwell's East Arkansas Broadcasters from Clear Channel Communications. 

KFIN is the flagship station for Arkansas' Morning Show with Brandon & Kelly (starring Brandon Baxter & Kelly Perry). 

KFIN is also the flagship station for the EAB Sports Network, Arkansas State Football, & Arkansas State Men's Basketball.

References

External links

FIN
Country radio stations in the United States